Javier Taboada (born 6 January 1935) is a former Mexican cyclist. He competed in the team pursuit at the 1960 Summer Olympics.

References

External links
 

1935 births
Living people
Mexican male cyclists
Olympic cyclists of Mexico
Cyclists at the 1960 Summer Olympics
Sportspeople from Mexico City